Five O'Clock Club was a 1960s British children's television pop programme on Rediffusion with Jimmy Hanley, Muriel Young, Howard Williams, and later Wally Whyton. The programme also featured appearances by Bert Weedon, and Grahame Dangerfield, and two glove puppets; Fred and Ollie, full names Ollie Beak and Fred Barker.

References

External links

British children's television series
British television shows featuring puppetry
1960s British children's television series
Television shows produced by Associated-Rediffusion